The 1999 Aylesbury Vale District Council election took place on 6 May 1999 to elect members of Aylesbury Vale District Council in Buckinghamshire, England. The whole council was up for election and the Liberal Democrats lost overall control of the council to no overall control.

Results

|}

References

1999 English local elections
1999
1990s in Buckinghamshire